Erich Neumann (31 May 1892 – 23 March 1951) was a Nazi politician.

Neumann was born in Forst (Lausitz) into a Protestant family. His father was a factory owner.

After receiving his Abitur, Neumann studied law and economics at the universities of Freiburg, Leipzig and Halle. He served in World War I and reached the rank of First Lieutenant (Oberleutnant). In 1920, he served as governmental civil servant in the Prussian Ministry of the Interior, and thereafter in the Essen District Office.

Neumann became Senior Executive Officer (Regierungsrat) in the Prussian Ministry of Commerce in 1923. In 1927/28, he became District President in Freystadt (Lower Silesia), then served as Ministerial Junior Assistant Secretary again in the Prussian Ministry of Commerce. In September 1932, he was appointed Permanent Secretary (Ministerialdirektor) in the Prussian Ministry of State, where he was in charge of administrative reforms.

Neumann joined the Nazi Party in May 1933, four months after Adolf Hitler took power. He joined the SS in 1934, being commissioned as a Major. In 1936, he was appointed the director of the Foreign Currency department of the Office of the Plenipotentiary for the Four Year Plan. By 1938, Neumann was promoted to undersecretary and attended Hermann Göring's meeting about the "Aryanisation" of the German economy. He represented the Ministries of Economy, Labour, Finances, Food, Transport and Armaments and Ammunition at the January 1942 Wannsee Conference, at which the genocidal Final Solution to the Jewish Question was planned. Neumann requested that Jewish workers in firms essential to the war effort not be deported for the time being. Between August 1942 and May 1945, Neumann was the general manager of the German Potassium Syndicate.

He was interned and interrogated by the Allies in 1945 after the war but released due to poor health in 1948. According to the German Federal Archives, Neumann died three years later in Garmisch-Partenkirchen, on 23 March 1951.

References

External links
 

1892 births
1951 deaths
People from Forst (Lausitz)
People from the Province of Brandenburg
German Army personnel of World War I
Nazi Party politicians
Nazi Party officials
German National People's Party politicians
Prussian politicians
SS-Oberführer
University of Freiburg alumni
Leipzig University alumni
Martin Luther University of Halle-Wittenberg alumni
German Protestants